John Leith may refer to:

John Farley Leith (1808–1887), Member of Parliament for Aberdeen
John H. Leith (1919–2002), theologian
John Leith (cricketer)
Jack Leith, Australian rules footballer